Anikó Hódi (born 11 April 1986) is a Hungarian amateur BMX cyclist. She represented her nation Hungary, as a 22-year-old elite rider, at the 2008 Summer Olympics and has been training throughout most of her BMX cycling career for Honvéd Bercsényi SE.

Hodi qualified for the Hungarian squad, as the nation's lone female rider, in women's BMX cycling at the 2008 Summer Olympics in Beijing by receiving an invitational berth from the Union Cycliste Internationale (UCI) based on her best performance at the UCI World Championships in Victoria, British Columbia, Canada. After she grabbed a fifteenth seed on the morning prelims with a time of 41.772, Hodi scored a total of 18 placing points to mount a sixth spot in the semifinals, thus eliminating her from the tournament.

References

External links
 
 
 
 
 

1986 births
Living people
BMX riders
Hungarian female cyclists
Olympic cyclists of Hungary
Cyclists at the 2008 Summer Olympics
People from Hódmezővásárhely
Sportspeople from Csongrád-Csanád County
21st-century Hungarian women